Kareeberg Local Municipality is a local municipality in the Pixley ka Seme District Municipality district of the Northern Cape province of South Africa. The name originates from a mountain range in the region, the Karee Mountains.

Main places
The 2001 census divided the municipality into the following main places:

Politics 

The municipal council consists of  eleven members elected by mixed-member proportional representation. Six councillors are elected by first-past-the-post voting in six wards, while the remaining five are chosen from party lists so that the total number of party representatives is proportional to the number of votes received. In the election of 1 November 2021  no party obtained a majority of seats on the council. The following table shows the results of the election.

By-elections from November 2021
The following by-elections were held to fill vacant ward seats in the period from the election in November 2021.

References

External links
 Official website

Local municipalities of the Pixley ka Seme District Municipality
Karoo